Hollywood Raw: The Original Sessions is an L.A. Guns album of previously unreleased recordings from 1987. Re-recorded versions of some of these songs later appeared on the band's eponymous first album.

Collector's Edition No. 1 has been re-released as a bonus CD with this album.

Track listing
 "Soho"
 "Nothing to Lose"
 "Bitch Is Back"
 "Down in the City"
 "Electric Gypsy"
 "Instrumental"
 "Guilty"
 "Hollywood Tease"
 "Love and Hate"
 "Midnight Alibi"
 "One More Reason"
 "One Way Ticket"
 "Shoot for Thrills"
 "Winter's Fool"
 "Alice in the Wasteland"
 "Don't Love Me"
 "When Dreams Don't Follow Through"
 "It's Not True"
 "Something Heavy"

References

L.A. Guns compilation albums
2004 compilation albums